Len Attewell (31 December 1895 – 26 February 1983) was a Welsh international rugby union prop who played club rugby for Newport.

Rugby career
Attewell began his rugby career with Newport Docks team Pill Harriers, but moved to Newport in 1914. A tough front row player, Attewell played at prop and hooker positions. In 1921 he was selected for the Welsh team against England on 15 January 1921. The Welsh team held several Newport players, including captain, Jack Wetter and centre Jerry Shea, but lost the match 18-3. He played three games for Wales, all in the 1921 Five Nations Championship

International matches played
Wales
  England 1921
  France 1921
  Scotland 1921

Bibliography

References

1895 births
1983 deaths
Wales international rugby union players
Welsh rugby union players
Rugby union props
Rugby union players from Newport, Wales
Newport RFC players
Pill Harriers RFC players